Axion is a genus of lady beetles in the family Coccinellidae. There are at least two described species in Axion.

Species
 Axion plagiatum (Olivier, 1808)
 Axion tripustulatum (De Geer, 1775) (three-spotted lady beetle)

References

Further reading

 
 
 
 

Coccinellidae
Coccinellidae genera